Nabil Ashoor Ramadhan Bait Faraj Allah (born 7 April 1982), commonly known as Nabil Ashoor, is an Omani footballer who plays for Dhofar S.C.S.C. in the Oman Professional League.

Club career

On 10 August 2014, he signed a contract extension with Dhofar S.C.S.C.

Club career statistics

International career
Nabil was selected for the national team for the first time in 2000. He has made appearances in the 2002 FIFA World Cup qualification, 2004 AFC Asian Cup, 2006 FIFA World Cup qualification and the 2010 FIFA World Cup qualification.

Honours

Club
With Al-Nasr
Omani League (0): 2003-04
Sultan Qaboos Cup (1): 2005

With Dhofar
Sultan Qaboos Cup (1): 2011
Oman Professional League Cup (1): 2012-13; Runner-up 2014–15
Oman Super Cup (0): Runner-up 2012
Baniyas SC International Tournament (1): Winner 2014

References

External links
 
 
 Nabil Ashoor at Goal.com
 
 

1982 births
Living people
Omani footballers
Oman international footballers
Omani expatriate footballers
Association football midfielders
2004 AFC Asian Cup players
Al-Nasr SC (Salalah) players
Dhofar Club players
Al Jahra SC players
Oman Professional League players
Expatriate footballers in Kuwait
Omani expatriate sportspeople in Kuwait
Footballers at the 2002 Asian Games
Asian Games competitors for Oman
Kuwait Premier League players